Rose Beatrix "Trixie" Laviña Cruz-Angeles (born March 29, 1965) is a Filipino lawyer and vlogger who served as Press Secretary of the Philippines from June 30, 2022 until October 4, 2022.

Education
Cruz-Angeles attended the University of the Philippines (UP) where she obtained a law degree in 1997. As of 2022, she is also pursuing an international relations degree at the University of Minnesota in the United States and a master's degree in archeology in UP.

Career

Government
From July 2017 to 2018, Cruz-Angeles was part of the Presidential Communications Operations Office (PCOO) as a social media strategist during the administration of President Rodrigo Duterte.

Cruz-Angeles is set to return to the PCOO when she was designated by President-elect Bongbong Marcos to lead the communications body as the Press Secretary once Marcos assume the presidency.

The appointment was despite her being a former critic of the Marcos family, remarking how no member has been made accountable of a crime after the People Power Revolution of 1986. She has also called for the imprisonment of former First Lady Imelda Marcos to be jailed in 2013 and justice for the assassination of Benigno Aquino Jr. She acknowledged that her stance towards the Marcoses has changed.

Cruz-Angeles has resigned from her post in October 4, citing health reasons, only having served 96 days as press secretary.

Legal career
As a lawyer, Cruz-Angeles had members of the Magdalo Group and former Iglesia ni Cristo worker Lowell Menorca as among her high-profile clients. She defended the Magdalo Group for their involvement a coup d'état attempt against the administration of President Gloria Macapagal Arroyo in the Oakwood mutiny in 2003. Menorca on his part was allegedly detained by his church at the height of a leadership controversy in 2015.

In 2016, the Supreme Court of the Philippines imposed a suspension against her for three years for violating the Code of Professional Responsibility. A client sued her for failing to process his annulment case despite payment of legal fees. Cruz-Angeles maintained she was not remiss in fulfilling her duties adding that the client failed to provide the address of his estranged wife and present sufficient evidence.

Other
Cruz-Angeles is a vlogger. She maintains the vlog "Luminous by Trixie Cruz-Angeles & Ahmed Paglinawan” which has 406,000 followers in Facebook and more than 85,000 subscribers. She was also a host in the radio program Karambola on DWIZ from 2018 to May 2022.

She was a publisher for the website Politiko and a columnist at the Philippine Daily Inquirer. She was also a lecturer at the Ateneo de Manila University and the Institute for Cultural and Arts Management.

References

 
|-

Bongbong Marcos administration cabinet members
Duterte administration personnel
Filipino bloggers
Filipino women bloggers
Academic staff of Ateneo de Manila University
University of the Philippines alumni
Filipino women lawyers
Living people
21st-century Filipino lawyers
1965 births